Colloids and Surfaces is a peer-reviewed journal of surface science. It was established in 1980. In 1993, it split into two parts Colloids and Surfaces A and Colloids and Surfaces B. The journal is published by Elsevier.

Colloids and Surfaces A
Colloids and Surfaces A: Physicochemical and Engineering Aspects focused on aspects related to applications of colloids and interfacial phenomena. The journal is published biweekly jointly edited by M. Adler, F. Grieser, J.B. Li and D. Prieve

Colloids and Surfaces B

Colloids and Surfaces B: Biointerfaces focuses on the biological aspects. It is published monthly jointly edited by J.L. Brash, H.J. Busscher, H. Chen and D. Danino.

References

Chemistry journals
Physics journals
Publications established in 1980